Park Mi-seon may refer to:
Park Mi-seon (athlete) (born 1964), South Korean sprinter
Park Mi-sun (born 1967), South Korean comedian
Park Si-yeon (born Park Mi-seon, 1979), South Korean actress

See also
Park (Korean surname)
Mi-sun, Korean feminine given name also spelled Mi-seon
Park Seon-mi (born 1982), South Korean field hockey player